Jiangnanwenshuyuan is a neighborhood on General Main Road No.99, in Jiangning District built by Nanjing Jinji Development Co., Ltd. and Inner Mongolia Baotou Steel Group, as a joint venture. The neighborhood landmark is a very grandiose gate consisting of two big white pillars which stand at each side of the gate. The design of the neighborhood is unique. It is a mixture of Jiangnan gardening and modern society. It is created in the Jiangnan style in Nanjing, a city at the north of the Yangtze River.

Transportation 
There is a bus stop at the gate. About seven routes stop at this bus stop. They are No. 105, No. 10, No. 18, No. 180, No. 154 with two special buses called "route 清安", from 清水门大街 to Andemen(). Another bus is "route 河奥". Between the Jiangning Customs Building and the neighborhood, there is a freeway leading to many places, such as Nanjing South Railway Station and Nanjing Lukou International Airport. Also, there is direct freeway access to Yuhuatai Memorial Park of Revolutionary Martyrs. Since ancient times, Zhonghua Gate has been the border dividing the city into urban and country. The government is building the Metro Line 3. After completion in 2014, there will be more than 13 routes, with access near to the neighbourhood.

Features

Virescence 

The house is designed by a famous architect. The neighborhood contains a lake and many trees and it makes the neighborhood seem like a park. The acreage of Virescence takes up 80% of the neighborhood. Many kinds of trees are planted in the neighborhood, such as poplar, Firmiana simplex, willow and others. Besides the trees in the neighborhood, there are also many flowers, including gardenias (Chinese:栀子花), roses, peach blossoms, and orchids.

Lake 

The lake is one of the most representative sites in the neighborhood. As lake springs from the Qinhuai River, the water quality is very good. Some people who enjoy fishing come to the lake and fish, usually for recreation. Sometimes, there are several mallards swimming alone the lake. Also some unidentified birds fly over the surface of the lake, dipping into the water at times. In winter, the lake partially freezes. If it is cold enough, it will make ice strong enough to support the weight of many people who can walk and skate on it.

Swimming pool 
The swimming area is located at the west of the lake, with two swimming pools available. One is large, having both deep and shallow water area. This pool is usually available to adults or teenagers, who are able to swim. The depth of deep water area is nearly 6.56 feet and the shallow area is 3.28 feet. Another one is comparatively small, especially for children who are under 6, and less than 1.64 feet tall. During summer holiday, there is a training agency set up a class teaching children how to swim.

House 

Houses in this neighborhood are distinctive, with three types, covering an area of 60 mu. The gross area is 270 mu, while the development area is 138 thousand square meters. The houses are small with green space is up to 75% of the gross area, but the building density is only about 19.26%, that is, in one apartment there is only one "busy" with the rest five are "free". So it likes a park more rather than a neighborhood. Houses are divided into three parts marked by the color of the roof. They are red, green and Grey.

Most people live in green roofed houses typicallyof about 100 square meters, suitable for a couple with a child. The price per square meter is about 12000 yuan, comparatively cheaper than others in Nanjing nowadays.
The red houses are, built around the lake but separated from it by a line of villas. The red houses are about 200 square meters, usually available to a couple with a kid and also with their parents. It is a kind of spring-layer house, having a Kitchen, a dining room, a Toilet, a balcony, an amusement room and a Drawing room in the first floor and two bedrooms, two Toilets, a restroom, a balcony in the second floor, with a 50-square-meter rooftop.

There are only two Grey houses or villas, which seen from a distance, look like a house built in the Qing dynasty, with a stream winding through the garden. On the roof of the villa, there is a Satellite television, Before the villa, there is a lake. Such a beautiful scene will be seen form the top of the roof. 
Garden is the most attractive place. It has about 300 square meters. A pave built up by cobblestone, with bambooes planted on each side.

Surroundings

Neighbourhoods 
The neighbourhood is beside Jiangjun mountain, facing Cuiping lake. Many neighborhoods are around it. Named 山水华门, 爱涛翠湖花园 and 瑞景文华, a high-grade housing for the wealthy. On the right of the neighborhood, there is Jiangning Customs Building.

University 
There are 3 parts in Nanjing especially for universities, usually called "city of university". As a big district in Nanjing, Jiangning District plays an important role in the construction of universities. Of course there are several universities near my  neighbourhood. They are Nanjing University of Aeronautics and Astronautics, Zhengde College, Hohai University, Southeast University. During holidays, when thousands of students return home, the city of university looks like an empty "city". Because there is no basketball field in Jiangnanwenshuyuan in the past years, some people will go to these universities to play basketball.

Relaxation zone 
Beside the city of university, there is a block called Tuolejia, with a lot of people live there and has a very big Suguo supermarket. There is a famous road in Jiangning district called Women's Road. It is near Jiangnanwenshuyuan. It serves as the market center and is a rather busy street. Many eateries, clothing stores, and a shopping mall are located along this road.

Industrial and Commercial Bank of China Limited 
There is a bank beside my neighborhood. It opened at 8 am and closed at 5 pm. So we all have a credit card which made us have convenience to save or draw money.
Also, Aitao relaxation zone is a place where people can have rest or some leisure, for example, yoga, Kung fu. It has a swimming pool, badminton court, and basketball court. Also, there is a bath center available to people. Overall, it is a place of relaxation.

Jiangjun mountain is a scenic spot in Jiangning District. Its height is about 300 meters high. It is a place where people enjoy hiking, running, and climbing. In autumn, the maple trees lining the road display vibrant fall colors. Many photography enthusiasts come to this place to take photos.

References 

Nanjing